The Canyons may refer to:

 The Canyons (film), a 2013 thriller directed by Paul Schrader
 Canyons Resort, formerly The Canyons, an alpine ski resort in Park City, Utah